The 2022 UAB Blazers football team represented the University of Alabama at Birmingham as a member of Conference USA (C-USA) during the 2022 NCAA Division I FBS football season. They were led by interim head coach Bryan Vincent, who was coaching his first season with the team. The Blazers played their home games at Protective Stadium in Birmingham, Alabama.

During the last season, on October 21, 2021, UAB accepted the invitation to join the American Athletic Conference (AAC) and will become a full member on July 1, 2023. The 2022 season is expected to be the program's last season as a member of Conference USA. On November 30, 2022 former NFL quarterback Trent Dilfer was announced as the new head coach of UAB football.

Schedule
UAB and Conference USA announced the 2022 football schedule on March 30, 2022.

Game summaries

Alabama A&M

at Liberty

Georgia Southern

at Rice

Middle Tennessee

Charlotte

at Western Kentucky

at Florida Atlantic

UTSA

North Texas

at LSU

at Louisiana Tech

Miami (OH) (Bahamas Bowl)

References

UAB
UAB Blazers football seasons
Bahamas Bowl champion seasons
UAB Blazers football